Andrew Malcolm Ellis (born 24 March 1982) is a New Zealand former international cricketer, who played in One Day Internationals (ODIs) and Twenty20 Internationals (T20Is). In first-class cricket, Ellis played 26 State Championship games for Canterbury, up to the end of the 2006/7 season. Ellis retired from all forms of cricket in March 2020. He was the second New Zealand cricketer to play 100 or more matches in each format of the game.

Domestic career
A right-handed batsman and right arm fast medium bowler, he made his debut in 2003 against Auckland. He has scored 910 first class runs at an average of 26.76, with a top score of 78 against Northern Districts. He has also taken 32 wickets at 43.68 with a best analysis of 5 for 63 against Otago.

In 11 List-A one-day matches he has scored 157 runs at 22.42 with a top score of 46 and taken 3 wickets at just over 40. He also played six Twenty20 games with moderate returns.

He played for New Zealand Under-19s in the 2000/01 season in 2 'Tests' against South Africa under-19s and appeared for Marylebone Cricket Club in 2004.

In November 2017, he scored his 5,000th run for Canterbury in first-class cricket in the 2017–18 Plunket Shield season. In June 2018, he was awarded a contract with Canterbury for the 2018–19 season.

In 2018, Ellis was involved in a bizarre incident when a shot off Northern Districts batsman Jeet Raval ricocheted off his head and crossed the boundary on the full, going for six runs.

References

External links
 

1982 births
Canterbury cricketers
Living people
New Zealand cricketers
New Zealand One Day International cricketers
New Zealand Twenty20 International cricketers
South Island cricketers